The Place de Fontenoy is a square in Paris, France, named after the victory of Maréchal Maurice de Saxe in the Battle of Fontenoy.

At number 7 is the World Heritage Centre, the headquarters of the UNESCO group.

References

Fontenoy
Buildings and structures in the 7th arrondissement of Paris